The 1921 Saint Louis Billikens football team was an American football team that represented Saint Louis University during the 1921 college football season. In their first season under head coach Stephen G. O'Rourke, the Billikens compiled a 4–4–1 record and was outscored by a total of 148 to 76. The team played its home games at St. Louis University Athletic Field on the school's campus in St. Louis.

Schedule

References

Saint Louis
Saint Louis Billikens football seasons
Saint Louis Billikens football